Storehorn, also written Storehødn, is a mountain located in the Hemsedal municipality. It is a part of Hemsedal Top 20.

Mountains of Viken